Simeri Crichi is a town and comune in the province of Catanzaro in the Calabria region of southern Italy.

Geography
The town is bordered by Catanzaro, Sellia, Sellia Marina and Soveria Simeri.

Notes and references

Cities and towns in Calabria